Menegazzo is a surname. Notable people with the surname include: 

Antonio Menegazzo (1931–2019), Italian Roman Catholic bishop
Carlos Soto Menegazzo, Guatemalan politician
Fernando Menegazzo (born 1981), Brazilian footballer
Peter Menegazzo (1944–2005), Australian grain grower and cattle baron